The 2020 Danish Individual Speedway Championship was the 2020 edition of the Danish Individual Speedway Championship. As in 2019, the final was staged over a single round at the Vojens Speedway Center. Anders Thomsen won his first national title, beating Nicolai Klindt, Marcus Birkemose and Leon Madsen.

Event format 
Each rider competed in five rides, with the four top scorers racing in an additional heat. The points from the additional heat were then added to the previous score from the five riders. The winner was the rider who accumulated the most points in all of their rides, and not the rider who won the additional heat.

Final 

{| width=100%
|width=50% valign=top|
30 September 2020
 Vojens

References 

Denmark
Speedway in Denmark
2020 in Danish motorsport